Painted Black may refer to:

Music
 "Paint It Black", the actual title of a commonly-misheard Rolling Stones song 
 Painted Black, a Portuguese heavy-metal band
 "Painted Black", a psychedelic song by Doldrums
 "Painted Black", a goth song by Mephisto Walz
 Painted Black, an electronic album by Klangkarussell

Literature
 Painted Black, a controversial 1990 book on Satanism by Carl Raschke
 Painted Black, a 2015 "Dust Bin Bob" novel (after Rubber Soul) by Greg Kihn

Other
 Painted Black, a stallion ridden by equestrians Hans Peter Minderhoud and Anky van Grunsven
 Painted Black, a dark stout beer by Fairhope Brewing Company